Nelson James Dunford (December 12, 1906 – September 7, 1986) was an American mathematician, known for his work in functional analysis, namely integration of vector valued functions, ergodic theory, and linear operators. The Dunford decomposition, Dunford–Pettis property, and Dunford-Schwartz theorem bear his name.

He studied mathematics at the University of Chicago and obtained his Ph.D. in 1936 at Brown University under Jacob Tamarkin. He moved in 1939 to Yale University, where he remained until his retirement in 1960.

In 1981, he was awarded jointly with Jacob T. Schwartz, his Ph.D. student, the well-known Leroy P. Steele Prize of the American Mathematical Society for the three-volume work Linear operators.

Nelson Dunford was coeditor of Transactions of the American Mathematical Society (1941–1945) and Mathematical Surveys and Monographs (1945–1949).

Publications 
  
 Nelson Dunford, Jacob T. Schwartz, Linear Operators, Part I General Theory , Part II Spectral Theory, Self Adjoint Operators in Hilbert Space , Part III Spectral Operators

References 
 Obituary in Notices Amer. Math. Soc., Vol. 34, 1987, p. 287

External links 

1906 births
1986 deaths
People from St. Louis
Mathematicians from Missouri
20th-century American mathematicians
Brown University alumni
Yale University faculty
Operator theorists
University of Chicago alumni